South Antrim was a constituency of the Parliament of Northern Ireland.

The House of Commons (Method of Voting and Redistribution of Seats) Act (Northern Ireland) 1929 introduced first-past-the-post elections for 48 single-member constituencies (including Antrim South).

Boundaries and boundary changes
This constituency was one of seven county divisions in County Antrim from 1929, and, after 1969, one of nine. The changes in the vicinity of Belfast affected the boundaries of this division.

It comprised (in terms of then local government units) part of the rural district of Lisburn and the whole of the urban district of Lisburn. In 1969, the part of the rural district closest to Belfast became the new seat of Antrim, Larkfield.

Antrim South returned one member of Parliament from 1929 until the Parliament of Northern Ireland was temporarily suspended in 1972, and then formally abolished in 1973.

Politics
County Antrim (except for parts of Belfast) is a strongly unionist area. There was never the slightest chance of a republican or nationalist candidate being elected in a single-member Antrim county constituency. Antrim South was not an exception.

From the Northern Ireland general election of 1929, the Antrim South division was an extremely safe Unionist seat for the rest of the existence of the Northern Ireland Parliament.

Members of Parliament

Elections

The elections in this constituency took place using the first past the post electoral system.

 Death of Barbour

 Resignation of McConnell

 Boundary change

 Resignation of Ferguson

 Parliament prorogued 30 March 1972 and abolished 18 July 1973

References
 Northern Ireland Parliamentary Election Results 1921-1972, compiled and edited by Sydney Elliott (Political Reference Publications 1973)

Northern Ireland Parliament constituencies established in 1929
Constituencies of the Northern Ireland Parliament
Historic constituencies in County Antrim
Northern Ireland Parliament constituencies disestablished in 1973